Danierma is a town in the Imasgho Department of Boulkiemdé Province in central western Burkina Faso. It has a population of 2,459.

References

Populated places in Boulkiemdé Province